Pseudoacalles is a genus of hidden snout weevils in the beetle family Curculionidae. There are at least three described species in Pseudoacalles.

Species
These three species belong to the genus Pseudoacalles:
 Pseudoacalles maculatus Blatchley, 1920
 Pseudoacalles michalis Blatchley & Leng, 1916
 Pseudoacalles nuchalis (LeConte, 1876)

References

Further reading

 
 
 

Cryptorhynchinae
Articles created by Qbugbot